DWSE (103.7 FM) is a radio station owned by Kaissar Broadcasting Network and operated by Y2H Broadcasting Network, Inc., serving as the Luzon flagship station of XFM Philippines. a media firm owned by multi-awarded broadcaster Sonia O. Leano. Its studios and transmitter are located at Dolor Hotel, #16 Vinzons Ave., Brgy. Magang, Daet.

History
November 2021, Boom FM was ended, Y2H Broadcasting Network, Inc. took over the entire operations and rebranded it as XFM with a news and music format.
XFM Daet is an originating station in the Bicol Region on April 17, 2022 - Easter Sunday, when the station held a grand opening and launching of the network, XFM Daet added more news, talk, music and wealth programs in the Bicol language with its local programming, together with veteran broadcast journalism of News FM networks in Camarines Norte as 102.9 Brigada News FM and 88.9 Idol News FM. Yes2Health Advertising, Inc. is headed by President and CEO Mr. Remelito Y. Uy, Vice President Mrs. Olivine T. Uy, Daet Camarines Norte Mayor Benito S. Ochoa, Y2H and XFM Philippines were present in the occasion.

References

Radio stations established in 2007
Radio stations in Camarines Norte